Tamralipta or Tamralipti was a port city and capital of Suhma Kingdom in ancient India, located on the coast of the Bay of Bengal. The Tamluk town in present-day Purba Medinipur, West Bengal, is generally identified as the site of Tamralipti.

It was located near the Rupnarayan river. It gets its name from the Sanskrit term "Tāmra," or copper, which was mined nearby at Ghatsila in the Singbhum region of the Chota Nagpur Plateau and traded through this port. During the Gupta dynasty, Tamralipta was the main emporium, serving as a point of departure for trade with Ceylon, Java, and China, as well as the west. It was linked by roads with the major cities of ancient India of that time, i.e., Rajagriha, Shravasti, Pataliputra, Varanasi, Champa, Kaushambi, and Taxila.

History
Tamralipta was surrounded in the south by the Bay of Bengal, east by the river Rupnarayana, and west by the river Subarnarekha. The Bay of Bengal, along with these incredible waterways, and their innumerable branches, built up an affluent and easy water navigation framework that cultivated commerce, culture, and early contacts with people from other parts of the world. The origins of Tamralipta are obscure. Many historians date its settlement to the seventh century B.C., but archaeological remains indicate its continuous settlement from about the third century B.C. Several literary sources, archaeological finds, epigraphy, and numismatic evidence are studied to construct the history of Tamralipta.

Literary Sources
In early Indian literary works, Tamralipta, with its other "dialectical variants," was mentioned. It was also mentioned by the Greek astronomer-geographer Ptolemy, the Roman author and philosopher Pliny, and the Chinese monk travellers Fa-hien, Hsuan-tsang, and Yi Jing.  The Kurma-vibhaga segment of the Atharva-veda Parisista incorporates the primal testimony to Tamralipta in Indian literary sources. The Mahabharata distinguishes this ancient city from Suhma, but a later work, Dashakumaracharita, adds "Damalipta" within the Suhma Kingdom. It is said that Tamralipta was the capital of Suhma. In the Raghuvamsha, it is described as being located on the bank of the river Kapisa. The Kathsaritsagara observes Tamralipta as an important maritime port and trading center. Some Pali literature identifies it as "Tamalitti" or "Tamalitthi" and describes it as a port. Tamralipti is mentioned numerous times in the Arthasastra as an imperative center of maritime exchange. The Brihat-Samhita distinguishes "Tamraliptika" from "Gaudaka" and mentions the sailing of ships from Yavana to the port of "Damalipta". Ptolemy mentions "Tāmralipta" as a significant town and royal residence. Pliny denotes Tamralipti as 'Taluctae'. The earliest meticulous description of Tamralipta appears in Buddhist literature. In the early fifth century CE, the Chinese Buddhist monk Fa-Hien reported seeing twenty Buddhist monasteries in Tamralipta. Fa-Hien traces Tamralipta, as situated on the seaboard. Whereas Hiuen-Tsang describes that Tamralipta was situated on a creek relatively away from the main Bay of Bengal. According to Hiuen-Tsang, this port town spanned approximately 250 miles and served as the point of convergence of the land and sea trade routes. According to him, the main exports from Tamralipta port were indigo, silk, and copper. In , the Chinese Buddhist monk YiJing reached the east coast of India. He spent five months in Tamralipti and learned Sanskrit. Yijing travelled up the Ganga from Tamralipti to the Buddhist monastery complex of Nalanda, which was the home of thirty-five hundred monks at that time. According to Mahavamsa, an epic history of Sri Lanka, it was the exit point for Ruler Vijaya's voyage to conquer Sri Lanka and the Buddhist mission propelled to Sri Lanka by the Mauryan emperor Ashoka. Tamralipta is mentioned in Dipavamsa as well. The Vanga is referred to as possessing the city of Tamralipta in one of the Jaina Upangas called Prajñāpanā. According to the Jaina texts, Tamralipta was the capital of the kingdom of Vanga. Tamralipta is mentioned as one of the Jaina ascetic orders in the Jaina Kalpasūtra.

Archaeological finds

Archaeological explorations have unveiled a chronology of habitations extending back to a period in which stone axes and rudimentary pottery were in use. Excavations in the Indian state of West Bengal have revealed a steatite seal with hieroglyphic and pictographic signs, thought to be of the Mediterranean root. Terracotta figurines, spindle-whorls and earthenware are accepted to be from Crete and Egypt. Findings in Tamralipta unearthed potteries characterized by rouletted ware, grey ware, redware, black polished ware, and northern black polished ware. The excavation carried out by the Archaeological Survey of India (ASI) discovered rammed floor levels and ring wells. Coins and terracotta figurines dating back to the Sunga period (3rd century B.C.) have been discovered during excavations at a site in Tamralipti. A brick-built stepped tank, dating back to the 2nd–3rd century A.D., was unearthed among the ancient structural remains of Tamralipta. Excavations at Moghalmari confirmed the presence of Buddhist vihars in the area, which was mentioned by Chinese travellers Fa Hien and Hiuen Tsang.

Epigraphy and numismatic evidence

Coins with engraved boat symbols, issued by the Satavahana Kings, were found on the Andhra coast. Punch mark coins with similar motifs were also excavated from different sites in Bengal. This evidence confirms brisk maritime activity in Bengal. The Roman gold coins found in Tamralipta indicate contact with the Romans. The terracotta seals, protected in the Tamralipta museum as examined by Mukherjee, are inscribed in the Kharoshti Brahmi script of the early centuries of the Christian era. The vessel depicted on the seal of Bangarh is a bowl-shaped sailing boat filled with corn. The bows of the vessel at both ends are decorated with "Makaramukhas". A seal found at Chandraketugarh has a boat with a single mast portrayed on it and bears the Kharoshti-Brahmi inscription. The ship motif found on the coin of Gautamiputra Yajna Satkarni and the boat motif painted in the cave of Ajanta are identical to this vessel. An archaeological excavation in Birbhum unearthed several pieces of evidence, including coins and other artefacts. In an inscription from Java, the merchant Budhagupta is mentioned as a resident of Raktamrittika. Most likely, Budhagupta sailed down the Ganga and took a ship from Tamralipta. The Dudhpani rock inscription of Udayman is probably the last South Asian inscription that contains the record of Tamralipta as a port city in 8th-century C.E.

Interpretation
The textual references have prompted academics to identify Tamralipti as one of the most prominent hubs of trade and commerce of early historic India. According to Darian, with the rise of the Mauryan Empire, Tamralipti rose to universal popularity as the chief harbour of the entire basin. Ships from Ceylon, Southeast Asia, western India, and the Middle East used to arrive at this port. The brick-built stepped tank, found in an archaeological excavation, indicates the prosperity of Tamralipta. At least from the beginning of the Christian era until the 11th or 12th century A.D., Tamralipti was an important port for the sea-borne trade of Bengal. Three significant routes of foreign exchange were transmitted from Tamralipti : one to Burma and beyond through the Arakan coast; a second to the Malaya peninsula and the Distant East via Paloura, near Chicacole; and a third to South India and Ceylon through Kalinga and the Coromandal coast. Tamralipta appears to have been connected by distinct routes with Pataliputra and Kausambi. The southern route, passing through Tamralipta and proceeding to the coastal region of Orissa, also reached as far as Kanchi in the south. Through the southern route, extra inland trade corridors in Kalinga were connected with Tamralipta. Tamralipta had multidirectional connections with diverse geographical locations of South Asia. It served as a gateway to countries such as Indonesia and as a departure point for excursions to Sri Lanka. Archaeological finds suggest the overseas connection of the Tamralipti with the Romans. According to the evidence of Kan-Tai (Fu-nan-chuan), a regular maritime route existed between China and Tamralipti in the middle of the third century A.D. A comparison between the Chandraketugarh terracottas and those recovered from Tamluk would imply that the former contained significantly more indigenous motifs, whereas at the latter site, several non-indigenous motifs have been unearthed. The existence of the Kharoshthi script in some of the inscriptions at Chandraketugarh suggests close interaction with the north-western part of the subcontinent, where this script was prominent. According to Sengupta, the difference in descriptions of the location of Tamralipta as made by Fa-Hien and Hiuen-Tsang indicates a profound geographical change that had occurred in between their visits. According to Chattopadhyay, in comparison to Chandraketugarh, the settlement aspects of Tamralipti addressed by the area of Tamluk on the right bank of the Rupnarayan, a feeder of the Bhagirathi, are as yet  unclear. The existence of Painted Grey Ware and Northern Black Polished Ware in the places near the waterways of Ghaghara, Ganga and Yamuna indicate the utilization of riverine channels for the ancient commerce networks. According to Dasgupta, Despite the undeniable significance of Tamralipta, little is known about its rulers and administration. According to him, both Fa-Hien and Hiuen-Tsang, the two Chinese travellers who stayed in Tamralipta, never revealed anything about the state organization or administration.

Causes of decline
Man-made issues such as political disorder, taxes, and foreign attack, as well as natural factors such as alteration in the courses of rivers, siltation, and erosion, have all contributed to the progressive deterioration of the Tamralipta port. The Saraswati river flowed through various courses until the seventh century A.D., when it discharged through the Rupnarayan estuary. Tamralipta was located on the right bank of the Rupnarayan river. The Saraswati branch that connects it to the Rupnarayan has been identified on a recent satellite image, and a map is being prepared. Fergusson also described this channel. The eastward flight of the flow from its off-take at Tribeni, as well as rapid sedimentation, contributed to the collapse of the channel. Since 700 A.D., the Saraswati had abandoned its allegiance to the Rupnarayan and migrated eastwards, opening a new outlet along the Sankrail, resulting in the decline of the port of Tamralipta.  Saptagram (colloquially known as Satgaon) emerged as a prominent port, following the demise of Tamralipta.

See also
 Vanga 
 Pundravardhana  
 Samatata  
 Medinipur

Notes

References

Sources

External links
Archaeological Museum, Tamluk (West Bengal)
Tamralipti in Banglapedia

Capitals of Bengal
Lost ancient cities and towns
Ancient Indian cities
Purba Medinipur district
Maritime history of India